Martania taiwana is a species of moth of the family Geometridae. It is found in Taiwan.

The wingspan is 17–21 mm.

References

Moths described in 1911
Perizomini
Moths of Taiwan